Gjern is a former railway town in central Denmark with a population of 1,398 (1 January 2022), located in Silkeborg Municipality in Region Midtjylland in Jutland, Denmark.

The town is the site of Jysk Automobilmuseum, a large museum of automobiles. Gjern has also a ski resort called Dayz Søhøjlandet Alpint Skicenter.

References

External links
Jysk Automobilmuseum

Cities and towns in the Central Denmark Region
Ski areas and resorts in Denmark
Silkeborg Municipality

de:Gjern Kommune
fo:Gjern kommuna
it:Gjern
nl:Gjern
no:Gjern kommune
pl:Gmina Gjern
pt:Gjern